NRO may stand for:
 National Reconciliation Ordinance, a Pakistani law
 National Reconnaissance Office, maintains United States reconnaissance 
 National Repertory Orchestra, in Colorado
 National Review Online, web version of the magazine National Review
 Nobeyama radio observatory, a division of the National Astronomical Observatory of Japan
 Non-resident Oriya, an informal term for people of Oriya ancestry
 Number Resource Organization, allocates IP numbers
 "Never Really Over", a song by Katy Perry, 2019